Rasri Balenciaga Chirathivat (born August 22, 1990), more commonly known as Margie, is a Thai actress and model, who first appeared in the lakorn called Kularb Tud Petch with Kittikun Sumridpansuk.

Early life and education 
Balenciaga was born to a Spanish father, Daniel Balenciaga, and a Thai Chinese mother, Orasri Poonkwan, who is a former model. She has one sister, Sadanun Balenciaga (nicknamed Marina), who is also a Thai actress. Balenciaga went to Wattana Wittaya Academy, and attended university at the Faculty of Business Administration in Tourism and Hospitality Management at Assumption University. She graduated on 24 January 2012 with a grade point average of 3.00.

Career 
Balenciaga is known for portraying Thichakorn "Kati" in Wayupak Montra which is one of the four series of 4 Hua Jai Haeng Koon Kao (4 Hearts of the Mountains) with Pakorn Chatborirak. In 2012, she was paired up with Mario Maurer in Ruk Kerd Talai Sode. In 2013, Balenciaga starred opposite Pirath "Mike" Nitipaisalkul who is a member of Thai boy band Golf & Mike together with his brother Pichaya Nitipaisalkul, better known as "Golf" in Raak Boon.

In 2014, Balenciaga was once again paired with Pakorn Chatborirak in Nai Suan Kwan.

Personal life 
Balenciaga became engaged to "Pok" Passarakorn Chirathivat on 8 December 2017. They married on 24 December 2017. On 4 April 2019, Balenciaga gave birth to fraternal twins, Mia Phatsara and Mika Rakorn.

Filmography

Film

TV series

Other

Concert 

 Sam Thahan Seua Sao Limited Edition Live Show
 LOVE IS IN THE AIR : CHANNEL3 CHARITY CONCERT

References

External links 
  
 

1990 births
Living people
Rasri Balenciaga Chirathiwat
Rasri Balenciaga Chirathiwat
Rasri Balenciaga Chirathiwat
Rasri Balenciaga Chirathiwat
Rasri Balenciaga Chirathiwat
Rasri Balenciaga Chirathiwat
Rasri Balenciaga Chirathiwat
Rasri Balenciaga Chirathiwat
Thai television personalities
Rasri Balenciaga Chirathiwat
Rasri Balenciaga Chirathiwat